The Movement for Renewal and Democratic Action (MOURAD) was a political party in the Comoros.

History
The party was established in 1990. It received 3.1% of the vote in the 1992 parliamentary elections, winning one seat in the Assembly of the Union.

References

Defunct political parties in the Comoros
1990 establishments in the Comoros
Political parties established in 1990